Jack Dean is a former American football player and coach.  He served as the head football coach at Eastern Illinois University from 1972 to 1974, compiling a record of 6–24–1.

Head coaching record

References

Year of birth missing (living people)
Living people
American football halfbacks
American football quarterbacks
Eastern Illinois Panthers football coaches
Northern Illinois Huskies football coaches
Northern Illinois Huskies football players
Wisconsin–Whitewater Warhawks football coaches